Del Bonita, also known as Port of Del Bonita, is an unincorporated community in Glacier County, Montana, United States. It is on the Canada–United States border, south of Del Bonita, Alberta, and is connected to its Canadian counterpart by the Del Bonita Border Crossing.

Climate
This climatic region is typified by large seasonal temperature differences, with warm to hot (and often humid) summers and cold (sometimes severely cold) winters.  According to the Köppen Climate Classification system, Del Bonita has a humid continental climate, abbreviated "Dfb" on climate maps.

References

Unincorporated communities in Glacier County, Montana
Unincorporated communities in Montana